Kate Hooven (born January 3, 1985) is an American synchronized swimmer who competed in the 2008 Summer Olympics.

References

American synchronized swimmers
Olympic synchronized swimmers of the United States
Synchronized swimmers at the 2008 Summer Olympics
1985 births
Living people
Place of birth missing (living people)